Mesophleps unguella is a moth of the family Gelechiidae. It was described by H.H. Li and Sattler in 2012 and is endemic to Kenya.

The forewings are pale ochre with several black spots along the termen.

Etymology
The species name is derived from Latin ungus (meaning nail) and the postfix -ellus and refers to the distally widened uncus in the male genitalia.

References

Moths described in 2012
Endemic moths of Kenya
unguella
Moths of Africa